Ghost Rider is the name of several fictional characters appearing in comic books published by Marvel Comics.

Ghost Rider, Ghost Riders, Ghostrider, or Ghostriders may also refer to:

Fiction

Marvel Comics comic book series
 Ghost Rider (comic book)
 Ghost Rider 2099, under the Marvel 2099 imprint
 Ghost Rider: Road to Damnation, a six-part mini-series under the Marvel Knights imprint

Marvel Comics characters
 Phantom Rider (originally Ghost Rider), first appeared in 1949
 Ghost Rider (Johnny Blaze), first appeared in 1972
 Ghost Rider (Danny Ketch), first appeared in 1990
 Ghost Rider (Robbie Reyes), first appeared in 2014

Films and video games
 The Ghost Rider (1935 film), film directed by Jack Jevne
 The Ghost Rider (1943 film), film directed by Wallace Fox
 Ghost Rider (1982 film), short film on bus safety
 Ghost Rider (2007 film)
 Ghost Rider: Spirit of Vengeance, 2012 film
 Ghost Rider (video game), based on the film

Television
 Marvel's Ghost Rider (TV series), a Hulu original series based on Robbie Reyes
 Ghost Rider, the first story arc in season 4 of  Agents of S.H.I.E.L.D.

Other
 Doruntine (novel) (AKA The Ghost Rider; originally in Albanian: Kush e solli Doruntinën), by Albanian writer Ismail Kadare

Military 
 Ghost Riders, nickname of US Navy Attack Squadron VA-164 1960–1975
 Ghostriders, nickname of US Navy fighter squadron VF-142 1948–1995
 Lockheed AC-130J Ghostrider, a US Air Force gunship

Music 
 Ghost Riders (Outlaws album), 1980
 Ghost Riders (Suicide album), 1986

Songs
(Ghost) Riders in the Sky: A Cowboy Legend, 1948
"Ghost Rider" (Suicide song), 1977
 "Ghost Rider", from the 2002 album Vapor Trails by Rush
 "Ghostrider", from the 1991 album Real Life by Simple Minds

Sport  
 Carolina Ghostriders, a defunct American indoor football team
 Fernie Ghostriders, a Canadian ice hockey team
 Osceola Ghostriders, a defunct American indoor football team
 Ghost Rider (motorcyclist), Swedish stunt motorcyclist and hooligan

Other uses 
 Ghost Rider (shadow), cast on Mount Hosmer, a mountain in British Columbia, Canada
 Ghost Rider: Travels on the Healing Road, a 2002 book by Rush band member Neil Peart
 Ghost Riders (myth), an ancient folk myth
 GhostRider (roller coaster)

See also 
 "(Ghost) Riders in the Sky: A Cowboy Legend", a 1948 song
 Ghost Riders in the Sky (Slim Whitman album), 1978
 Ghost riding, similar to car surfing
 Ghostin (disambiguation)
 Ghostwriter (disambiguation)
 Headless Horseman (disambiguation)